is a Japanese professional shogi player ranked 7-dan.

Early life
Satō was born on June 12, 1978, in Matsudo, Chiba Prefecture. The first shogi book he ever read was a book written by shogi professional Hifumi Katō. The book was written for beginners and explained the apprentice school system and what it took to become a shogi professional. After reading this book, Satō decided to try and become strong enough to become an apprentice professional before graduating from elementary school, but still considered shogi to be just a hobby. As a fourth-grade student, he started traveling to neighboring Kashiwa to practice at the Kashiwa Shogi Center.

Satō entered the Japan Shogi Association's apprentice school as a student of shogi professional  at the rank of 6-kyū in 1990, was promoted to the rank of 1-dan in 1994 and then obtained full professional status and the rank of 4-dan after finishing second in the 33rd 3-dan League with a record of 14 wins and 4 losses.

Promotion history
Satō's promotion history is as follows:
 6-kyū: 1990
 1-dan: 1994
 4-dan: October 1, 2003
 5-dan: November 2, 2007
 6-dan: March 24, 2014
 7-dan: October 30, 2019

Awards and honors
Satō won the Japan Shogi Association's Annual Shogi Award for "Most Consecutive Wins" for the 20072008 shogi year.

References

External links
ShogiHub: Professional Player Info · Sato, Kazutoshi

Japanese shogi players
Living people
Professional shogi players
Professional shogi players from Chiba Prefecture
1978 births
People from Matsudo